The Paradise Theater, formerly Loew's Paradise Theatre, is a movie palace-type theater located at 2417 Grand Concourse in the Bronx, New York. Constructed in 1929 at the height of grand movie theaters, in the later 20th century the building was used also for live entertainment. It was leased in 2012 for use by the World Changers Church International New York for founding a local congregation.

History

Opening and context
Loew's Paradise Theatre opened on September 7, 1929 with Warner Oland in the film The Mysterious Dr. Fu Manchu on the screen, plus a stage presentation "Cameos" produced by Chester Hale, and British organist Harold Ramsey playing the 4-manual, 23-rank Robert Morton "Wonder Organ". The Paradise was originally commissioned by the Paramount-Publix theater chain and was slated to be named the Venetian Theatre. Paramount-Publix withdrew from the project shortly before construction began and it was taken over by New York's largest movie theatre chain, Loew's Theatres. The theater was promoted as one of the five "Loew's Wonder Theatres".

The first "Wonder Theatre", opened in January 1929, was Loew's Valencia Theatre in Jamaica, Queens. Loew's Paradise Theatre in the Bronx opened on the same day as Loew's Kings Theatre in Brooklyn. These were followed by Loew's Jersey Theatre in Jersey City, New Jersey, Loew's Pitkin in Brownsville, Brooklyn, and finally Loew's 175th Street Theatre in Washington Heights, Manhattan. The Loew's Paradise Theatre was one of the last theatres built in the Atmospheric style toward the end of the "movie palace" building boom. The theater's architect, John Eberson, was famed for creating the Atmospheric theater design, which gave the illusion of an outdoor villa courtyard under a night sky. The Paradise is one of the best remaining examples of his work. Many of his other elaborate designs, including the Paradise Theatre in Chicago (1928–1956), have been demolished.

Decline, landmarking, and reopening
With the dawn of the Great Depression, live acts were dropped from the program schedule and the Paradise became a regular first-run movie theatre. In the late 1940s a concrete slab was installed over the orchestra pit to create four extra rows of seats. It covered the orchestra pit and organ console. The slab was lifted only once, in the 1960s, to enable the removal of the organ console. Together with the rest of the organ pipes, the console was moved and installed at the Loew's Jersey Theatre. (Its original organ was removed in 1949, and moved to the Arlington Theatre in Santa Barbara, California).

Over the years, many features and fittings in the Paradise disappeared through theft. By the late 1960s it was on the market for redevelopment, and was open only for evening performances. The theatre was divided in two in December 1973, then in 1975 it was triplexed, and in 1981 was divided for four screening rooms. These changes hid practically all the original auditorium interior behind drop ceilings and panel walls.

The Paradise Theatre closed in 1994 and was empty for six years. By November 2000, work had begun on a restoration, but this was halted due to an ownership rights dispute with the restorer. A new owner took control and completed the renovation, re-opening in October 2005 as a live theatre and special events venue.  Bernie Williams appeared at the Paradise playing guitar with his band on September 22, 2007. The Paradise Theater was scheduled to have opened again on October 24, 2009 under new ownership. Concert promoters Derrick Sanders and Shelby Joyner scheduled a Grand Opening performance by Charlie Wilson of The Gap Band.

In 2012, the building was leased to the World Changers Church New York, a prosperity gospel congregation which is led by Atlanta-based pastor Creflo Dollar and his wife Taffi.

The building was designated as a New York City Landmark in 1997. It was designated as a New York City Interior Landmark in 2006.

Design

Exterior 
Along the Grand Concourse, local ordinance forbids the use of large vertical signs. This restrained the design of the facade of the theatre. On top of the frontage, over the entrance, is the space originally occupied by a mechanical Seth Thomas clock, where hourly St. George slew a fire-breathing dragon. As the Bronx Paradise was vandalized in later years, both the dragon and the figure of St. George were stolen. Only the saint's horse remains. A similar device, now renovated, was also installed at the Loew's Jersey Theatre in Jersey City.

Interior

Lobby
The main lobby, reached through a set of bronze doors from the outer lobby, features three domes in the ceiling containing painted murals depicting Sound, Story and Film. In the center of the north wall, beneath a statue of Winged Victory, was a large Carrara marble fountain featuring the figure of a child on a dolphin. At the base of the Grand Stair hung an oil painting of Marie Antoinette as Patron of the Arts and a copy of artist Holbein's Anne of Cleves.

Auditorium 
The auditorium was designed to represent a 16th-century Italian baroque garden, bathed in Mediterranean moonlight, with stars twinkling in the ceiling as clouds passed by. Hanging vines, cypress trees, stuffed birds and classical statues and busts lined the walls. The safety curtain was painted with a gated Venetian garden scene, which continued the garden effect around the auditorium when it was lowered.

See also 
 List of New York City Designated Landmarks in The Bronx
 Kent Theater

References 

Boxing venues in New York City
Cinemas and movie theaters in New York City
Culture of the Bronx
Loew's Theatres buildings and structures
New York City Designated Landmarks in the Bronx
Music venues in the Bronx
Movie palaces
Theatres completed in 1929
Theatres in the Bronx
Sports venues in the Bronx
1929 establishments in New York City
New York City interior landmarks